Attorney General Silva (or De Silva) may refer to:

C. R. De Silva (died 2013), Attorney General of Sri Lanka
Manikku Wadumestri Hendrick de Silva (fl. 1930s–1960s), Attorney General of Ceylon
Pandikoralalage Sunil Chandra De Silva (fl. 1980s–1990s), Attorney General of Sri Lanka
Sarath N. Silva (born 1946), Attorney General of Sri Lanka